The 1929 Simmons Cowboys football team represented Simmons University—now known as Hardin–Simmons University—as a member of the Texas Conference during 1929 college football season. Led by Frank Bridges in his third and final season as head coach, the team went 5–4–1 overall, tying for fourth place in the Texas Conference with a mark of 1–3–1.

Schedule

References

Simmons
Hardin–Simmons Cowboys football seasons
Simmons Cowboys football